The Camanche Community School District is a rural public school district headquartered in Camanche, Iowa.

The district is completely within Clinton County, and serves the city of Camanche and the surrounding rural areas.  

Thomas Parker, a native of Camanche, was hired as superintendent in 2001.

List of schools
The Camanche Community School District operates three schools, all in Camanche:
Camanche Elementary
Camanche Middle School
Camanche High School

Camanche High School

Athletics
The Storm compete in the River Valley Conference in the following sports:

Baseball
 1987 Class 3A State Champions 
Bowling
Basketball (boys and girls)
Cross Country (boys and girls)
Football
Golf (boys and girls)
Soccer (boys and girls)
Softball
Tennis (boys and girls)
 Boys' - 9-time Class 1A State Champions (1983, 1984, 1985, 1986, 1988, 1989, 1990, 1992, 1995)
 Girls' - 4-time Class 1A State Champions (1997, 2009, 2010, 2012)
Track and Field (boys and girls)
 Girls' - 2-time Class 2A State Champions (1986, 1987)
Volleyball
Wrestling

See also
List of school districts in Iowa
List of high schools in Iowa

References

External links
 Camanche Community School District

School districts in Iowa
Education in Clinton County, Iowa